Porpetto is a comune (municipality) in the Province of Udine in the Italian region Friuli-Venezia Giulia, located about  northwest of Trieste and about  south of Udine.

The municipality of Porpetto contains the frazioni (subdivisions, mainly villages and hamlets) Castello, Corgnolo, Foredana and Pampaluna.
The river Corno crosses the city.

Porpetto borders the following municipalities: Castions di Strada, Gonars, San Giorgio di Nogaro, Torviscosa.

Demographic evolution

References

External links
 www.comune.porpetto.ud.it

Cities and towns in Friuli-Venezia Giulia